The 1938 Soviet Cup was an association football cup competition of the Soviet Union.

Competitions in groups 14–18 were conducted as a regional competitions of the 1938 Cup of the Ukrainian SSR.

Competition schedule

Preliminary stage

Group 1 (Moscow)

Subgroup 1

Quarterfinals
 [Jun 26] 
 ZENIT Kolomna                10-0  Lokomotiv Ryazan 
 [Jun 28] 
 Krasnaya Roza Moskva          1-2  KAUCHUK Moskva                  [aet]
 [Jun 30] 
 CDKA-2 Moskva                 1-0  Krasnoye Znamya Moskva          [aet]
 Kamvolny Kombinat Kuntsevo    1-3  SHERSTYANIK Moskva   
 Kombinat Teikovo              2-5  STALINETS-2 Moskva 
 Zvezda Orekhovo-Zuyevo        0-4  SPARTAK-2 Moskva 
 Rodina Fryazino               0-1  FABRIKA BABAYEVA Moskva    
 TOMNA Kineshma                3-2  Pravda Moskva 
 VC-168 Ryazan                 0-8  MYASOKOMBINAT MIKOYANA Moskva  
 ZAVOD GORBUNOVA Moskva        3-1  Krasny Proletariy Moskva 
 Zenit Tula                    1-2  LOKOMOTIV-2 Moskva              [aet]

Semifinals
 [Jul 6] 
 Fabrika Babayeva Moskva       3-4  LOKOMOTIV-2 Moskva   
 Kauchuk Moskva                0-6  SHERSTYANIK Moskva  
 LOKOMOTIV Lyublino            w/o  Lokomotiv Ryazan 
 Spartak Ivanovo               2-4  DINAMO Ivanovo   
 Spartak-2 Moskva              1-1  Myasokombinat Mikoyana Moskva 
 STALINETS-2 Moskva            5-3  Lokomotiv Serpukhov 
 ZAVOD GORBUNOVA Moskva        3-1  CDKA-2 Moskva

=Semifinals replays=
 [Jul 7] 
 SPARTAK-2 Moskva              7-1  Myasokombinat Mikoyana Moskva

Finals
 [Jul 12] 
 Dinamo Ivanovo                1-3  SPARTAK-2 Moskva 
 Lokomotiv Lyublino            3-3  Lokomotiv-2 Moskva   
 SHERSTYANIK Moskva            3-1  Zavod Gorbunova Moskva 
 Zenit Kolomna                 1-3  STALINETS-2 Moskva

=Final replays=
 [Jul 13] 
 Lokomotiv Lyublino            2-3  LOKOMOTIV-2 Moskva

Subgroup 2

Quarterfinals
 [Jun 26] 
 SNIPER Podolsk                3-1  Zavod-20 Moskva 
 [Jun 30] 
 DINAMO Bolshevo               5-0  TsvetMet Moskva 
 Osnova Ivanovo                0-6  ZIF Moskva    
 PROLETARSKAYA POBEDA Moskva   w/o  Dinamo-2 Moskva 
 START Moskva                  6-0  SelMash Lyubertsy 
 ZAVOD GEOFIZIKA Moskva        9-0  MashTekhSoyuz Moskva 
 ZENIT Kovrov                  1-0  Dinamo Kalinin 
 ZENIT Podlipki                7-0  Sniper Moskva

Semifinals
 [Jul 6] 
 Burevestnik Tula              1-2  TRUD Krasnaya Polyana   
 DINAMO Bolshevo               3-2  Zavod Geofizika Moskva 
 Dinamo Lyubertsy              2-6  KIM Moskva   
 FABRIKA PRAVDA Likino-Dulyovo w/o  Pishchevik-2 Moskva 
 Kr Znamya Pavlovskiy Posad    0-4  KRASNOYE ZNAMYA Noginsk   
 SNIPER Podolsk                5-0  Zenit Kovrov 
 ZENIT Podlipki                6-0  Proletarskaya Pobeda Moskva 
 ZIF Moskva                    3-0  Start Moskva

Finals
 [Jul 12] 
 DINAMO Bolshevo               8-0  Sniper Podolsk 
 FABRIKA PRAVDA Likino-Dulyovo 5-1  KIM Moskva 
 KRASNOYE ZNAMYA Noginsk       5-2  Trud Krasnaya Polyana 
 ZENIT Podlipki                4-2  ZiF Moskva

Group 2 (Leningrad)

Semifinals
 [Jul 8] 
 IZHORSKIY ZAVOD Leningrad     3-0  ZiO Leningrad 
 Lokomotiv Vologda             2-5  ZAVOD ELEKTRIK Leningrad 
 ZiS Leningrad                 0-3  KIROVSKIY ZAVOD Leningrad

Finals
 [Jul 12] 
 Kauchuk Leningrad             1-3  ZIK Leningrad   
 KIROVSKIY ZAVOD Leningrad     6-0  Izhorskiy Zavod Leningrad 
 LOKOMOTIV Yaroslavl           2-1  Krasnaya Zarya-2 Leningrad 
 ZAVOD ELEKTRIK Leningrad      4-3  GOMZ Leningrad

Group 3 (Voronezh)

Quarterfinals
 [Jul 6] 
 Dinamo Kursk                  1-2  DZERZHINETS Bezhitsa   
 Samolyot Tambov               1-2  DINAMO Voronezh   
 ZIV Voronezh                  3-1  DKA Voronezh

Semifinals
 [Jul 12] 
 DINAMO Voronezh               4-0  Spartak Voronezh 
 Dzerzhinets Bezhitsa          0-2  ZIV Voronezh

Final
 [Jul 18] 
 DINAMO Voronezh               1-0  ZiV Voronezh

Group 4 (Khabarovsk)

Quarterfinals
 [Jul 16] 
 STROITEL Komsomolsk-na-Amure  5-1  Krylya Sovetov Irkutsk

Semifinals
 [Jul 12] 
 DINAMO Khabarovsk             7-0  Lokomotiv Irkutsk 
 [Jul 30] 
 DINAMO Irkutsk                3-1  Stroitel Komsomolsk-na-Amure

Final
 [Aug 5] 
 DINAMO Irkutsk                2-1  Dinamo Khabarovsk

Group 5 (Novosibirsk)

First round
 [Jul 6] 
 LOKOMOTIV Krasnoyarsk         1-0  Dinamo Novosibirsk              [aet] 
 STROITEL Novosibirsk          4-2  Krylya Sovetov Novosibirsk 
 TEKHNIKUM FK Novosibirsk      w/o  Lokomotiv Tyumen

Quarterfinals
 [Jul 11] 
 DKA Omsk                      4-2  Lokomotiv Omsk 
 [Jul 12] 
 Dinamo Omsk                   0-3  METALLURG Stalinsk 
 STROITEL Novosibirsk          1-0  Dinamo Krasnoyarsk 
 TEKHNIKUM FK Novosibirsk      2-1  Lokomotiv Krasnoyarsk

Semifinals
 [Jul 18] 
 METALLURG Stalinsk            5-0  Tekhnikum FK Novosibirsk 
 STROITEL Novosibirsk          3-0  DKA Omsk

Final
 [Jul 30] 
 STROITEL Novosibirsk          4-1  Metallurg Stalinsk

Group 6 (Sverdlovsk)

Quarterfinals
 [Jul 6] 
 DINAMO Chelyabinsk           10-0  Metallurg Magnitogorsk 
 Dinamo Kirov                  1-3  DINAMO Sverdlovsk 
 Dinamo Kungur                 2-4  METALLURG Sverdlovsk    
 Torpedo Izhevsk               1-3  STROITEL Sverdlovsk     
 TRAKTOR Chelyabinsk           4-3  Zenit Votkinsk

Semifinals
 [Jul 12] 
 DINAMO Chelyabinsk            2-0  Metallurg Sverdlovsk 
 STROITEL Sverdlovsk           7-1  Dinamo Ufa 
 TsvetMet Krasnouralsk         1-1  Avangard Sverdlovsk 
 [Jul 14] 
 Traktor Chelyabinsk           0-9  DINAMO Sverdlovsk

Semifinals replays
 [Jul 13] 
 TSVETMET Krasnouralsk         3-1  Avangard Sverdlovsk

Finals
 [Jul 18] 
 DINAMO Sverdlovsk             7-1  TsvetMet Krasnouralsk 
 STROITEL Sverdlovsk           3-1  Dinamo Chelyabinsk

Group 7 (Gorkiy)

Quarterfinals
 [Jul 6] 
 DINAMO Kazan                  4-0  Spartak Kazan 
 DINAMO Saransk                4-1  Metallist Pavlovo 
 Elektrik Gorkiy               1-2  SPARTAK Gorkiy   
 SPARTAK Pavlovo               5-1  Lokomotiv Kazan 
 TORPEDO Gorkiy                6-2  Krylya Sovetov Gorkiy

Semifinals
 [Jul 12] 
 DINAMO Kazan                  3-0  Spartak Gorkiy 
 DINAMO Yoshkar-Ola            8-2  Lokomotiv Ruzayevka 
 Spartak Saransk               0-4  DINAMO Saransk   
 TORPEDO Gorkiy               10-1  Spartak Pavlovo

Finals
 [Jul 18] 
 Dinamo Saransk                1-9  DINAMO Kazan   
 TORPEDO Gorkiy                3-0  Dinamo Yoshkar-Ola

Group 8 (Povolzhye)

Quarterfinals
 [Jul 7]
 ELEKTRIK Saratov              w/o  DKA Stalingrad 
 PISHCHEVIK Astrakhan          w/o  Zenit-221 Stalingrad 
 TRAKTOR-2 Stalingrad          1-0  Vodnik Astrakhan

Semifinals
 [Jul 12] 
 Elektrik Saratov              0-2  LOKOMOTIV Kuibyshev 
 Lokomotiv Saratov             2-2  Krylya Sovetov Saratov 
 Spartak Kuibyshev             0-2  DINAMO Stalingrad 
 [Jul 13] 
 Pishchevik Astrakhan          2-3  TRAKTOR-2 Stalingrad

Semifinals replays
 [Jul 13] 
 LOKOMOTIV Saratov             5-0  Krylya Sovetov Saratov

Finals
 [Jul 18] 
 Lokomotiv Kuibyshev           0-2  DINAMO Stalingrad 
 LOKOMOTIV Saratov             4-3  Traktor-2 Stalingrad            [aet]

Group 9 (Rostov-na-Donu)

Semifinals
 [Jul 6] 
 Dinamo Krasnodar              3-4  ZENIT Taganrog                  [aet]   
 ENERGIYA Novocherkassk        3-1  Medik Krasnodar 
 Krylya Sovetov Taganrog       1-3  PISHCHEVIK Rostov-na-Donu   
 Pishchevik Krasnodar          0-1  MYASOKOMBINAT Maykop

Finals
 [Jul 12] 
 ENERGIYA Novocherkassk        3-0  Pishchevik Rostov-na-Donu 
 ZENIT Taganrog                4-0  Myasokombinat Maykop

Group 10 (Tbilisi)

Quarterfinals
 [Jul 6] 
 DINAMO Batumi                 4-1  Nauka Tbilisi

Semifinals
 [Jul 12] 
 Spartak Leninakan             1-2  DINAMO Batumi 
 SPARTAK Yerevan               2-0  Pishchevik Tbilisi

Final
 [Jul 18] 
 DINAMO Batumi                 3-0  Spartak Yerevan

Group 11 (Baku)

Quarterfinals
 [Jul 6] 
 VODNIK Baku                   3-1  Stroiteli Baku

Semifinals
 [Jul 7] 
 LOKOMOTIV Baku               11-0  Lokomotiv Ashkhabad 
 [Jul 8] 
 Vodnik Baku                   0-4  NEFTYANIK Baku

Final
 [Jul 12] 
 LOKOMOTIV Baku                3-1  Neftyanik Baku

Group 12 (Tashkent)

Quarterfinals
 [Jul 6] 
 Dinamo Stalinabad             2-4  DINAMO Tashkent   
 [Jul 12] 
 DINAMO Karaganda              2-1  Lokomotiv Tashkent

Semifinals
 [Jul 17] 
 DINAMO Alma-Ata               5-2  Dinamo Tashkent 
 DINAMO Karaganda              w/o  Spartak Tashkent

Final
 [Jul 22] 
 DINAMO Alma-Ata               1-0  Dinamo Karaganda

Group 13 (Minsk)

Quarterfinals
 [Jul 6] 
 Tekhnikum FK Smolensk         3-4  SPARTAK Minsk   
 [Jul 7] 
 DINAMO Smolensk               5-0  KIM Minsk

Semifinals
 [Jul 12] 
 Spartak Gomel                 2-4  DINAMO Smolensk   
 SPARTAK Minsk                 w/o  Dinamo Minsk

Final
 [Jul 18] 
 SPARTAK Minsk                 1-0  Dinamo Smolensk

Group 14 (Kharkov)

First round
 [May 5] 
 Avangard Sumy                 1-5  MOLNIYA Kharkov 
 Roth Front Poltava            0-1  AVANGARD Kharkov 
 [May 6] 
 Kanatny Zavod Kharkov         1-4  STALINETS Kharkov   
 LOKOMOTIV Kharkov             1-0  Dinamo Poltava 
 SelMash-2 Kharkov             0-2  AVTOMOTOR Kharkov   
 Spartak Poltava               0-1  SAKHARNIKI Sumy 
 SPARTAK Sumy                  1-0  Sakharniki Karlovka 
 TRAKTOR Kharkov               w/o  Lokomotiv Poltava 
 ZDOROVYE Kharkov              w/o  Dinamo Kharkov 
 ZENIT Kharkov                 3-1  Metallist Kharkov

Quarterfinals
 [May 11] 
 STALINETS Kharkov             4-1  Avtomotor Kharkov 
 ZDOROVYE Kharkov              4-3  Avangard Kharkov 
 [May 12] 
 LOKOMOTIV Kharkov             1-0  Sakharniki Sumy 
 ZENIT Kharkov                 w/o  Molniya Kharkov 
 [May 13] 
 TRAKTOR Kharkov               5-1  Spartak Sumy

Semifinals
 [May 15] 
 ZENIT Kharkov                 3-0  Stalinets Kharkov 
 Byes: Zdorovye, Traktor, Lokomotiv.

Finals
 [May 24] 
 LOKOMOTIV Kharkov             3-0  Zenit Kharkov 
 ZDOROVYE Kharkov              1-0  Traktor Kharkov

Group 15 (Kiev)

Quarterfinals
 [May 5] 
 Dinamo Zhitomir               1-1  Dinamo Mogilyov-Podolskiy 
 [May 6] 
 Azot Shostka                  1-10 DINAMO-2 Kiev 
 Dinamo Vinnitsa               1-1  Vodnik Kiev 
 LOKOMOTIV Konotop             w/o  DKA Korosten 
 LOKOMOTIV-2 Kiev              4-2  Roth Front Kiev 
 Spartak Kiev                  1-2  TEKHNIKUM FK Kiev   
 Spartak Korosten              w/o  SPARTAK Chernigov 
 ZENIT Kiev                    5-3  Temp Vinnitsa

Quarterfinals replays
 [May 6] 
 DINAMO Zhitomir               1-0  Dinamo Mogilev-Podolskiy 
 [May 7] 
 Dinamo Vinnitsa               1-2  VODNIK Kiev                     [aet]

Semifinals
 [May 12] 
 DINAMO-2 Kiev                 3-1  Dinamo Zhitomir   
 Tekhnikum FK Kiev             0-3  LOKOMOTIV-2 Kiev   
 VODNIK Kiev                   2-0  Spartak Chernigov   
 ZENIT Kiev                    5-1  Lokomotiv Konotop

Finals
 [May 19] 
 LOKOMOTIV-2 Kiev              3-2  Zenit Kiev 
 [May 20] 
 DINAMO-2 Kiev                 2-1  Vodnik Kiev                     [aet]

Group 16 (Odessa)

Quarterfinals
 [May 6] 
 Burevestnik Krivoi Rog        3-3  Lokomotiv Kotovsk 
 DZERZHINETS Kremenchug        4-0  Spartak Tiraspol 
 LOKOMOTIV Odessa              4-0  Ruda Krivoi Rog 
 Lokomotiv Voznesensk          1-3  PISHCHEVIK Odessa   
 Pishchevik Kherson            0-4  DINAMO Nikolayev 
 SELMASH Kirovo                2-1  Znaniye Kherson 
 Stroitel Krivoi Rog           1-3  STAL Krivoi Rog   
 SUDOSTROITEL Nikolayev        8-0  Vodnik Kherson

Quarterfinals replays
 [May 7] 
 BUREVESTNIK Krivoi Rog        w/o  Lokomotiv Kotovsk

Semifinals
 [May 12] 
 Burevestnik Krivoi Rog        2-4  LOKOMOTIV Odessa   
 DINAMO Nikolayev              7-0  Stal Krivoi Rog 
 Dzerzhinets Kremenchug        2-0  SelMash Kirovo   
 [May 18] 
 PISHCHEVIK Odessa             4-1  Sudostroitel Nikolayev

Finals
 [May 18] 
 DINAMO Nikolayev              3-0  Lokomotiv Odessa 
 [May 24] 
 PISHCHEVIK Odessa             w/o  Dzerzhinets Kremenchug

Group 17 (Dnepropetrovsk)

Quarterfinals
 [May 5] 
 STAL Dneprodzerzhinsk         7-0  Tekhnikum FK Dnepropetrovsk 
 LOKOMOTIV Zaporozhye          3-2  Lokomotiv Dnepropetrovsk 
 ZiP Dnepropetrovsk            1-3  SELMASH Zaporozhye 
 [May 6] 
 Krylya Sovetov Berdyansk      0-5  DINAMO Dnepropetrovsk 
 LOKOMOTIV Lozovaya            6-1  Lokomotiv Sinelnikovo 
 SPARTAK Dnepropetrovsk        3-0  Krylya Sovetov Zaporozhye 
 Stroitel Dneprodzerzhinsk     0-4  ZIL Dnepropetrovsk 
 TSVETMET Zaporozhye           5-3  ZiK Dnepropetrovsk

Semifinals
 [May 12] 
 Dinamo Dnepropetrovsk         0-1  SPARTAK Dnepropetrovsk          [aet]   
 STAL Dneprodzerzhinsk         4-1  SelMash Zaporozhye 
 [May 13] 
 ZiL Dnepropetrovsk            1-2  TSVETMET Zaporozhye   
 [May 15] 
 LOKOMOTIV Zaporozhye          6-1  Lokomotiv Lozovaya

Finals
 [May 18] 
 LOKOMOTIV Zaporozhye          4-2  TsvetMet Zaporozhye 
 SPARTAK Dnepropetrovsk        4-2  Stal Dneprodzerzhinsk

Group 18 (Donetsk)

First round
 [May 5] 
 Azot Nizhnyaya Gorlovka       1-2  BUREVESTNIK Stalino 
 [May 6] 
 Avangard Stalino              2-3  SHAKHTA-30 Rutchenkovo 
 Dzerzhinets Voroshilovgrad    0-6  STAL Konstantinovka 
 Lokomotiv Slavyansk           3-4  ZIS Kramatorsk 
 Lokomotiv Yasinovataya        1-2  ZIL Krasnogorovka 
 Spartak Starobelsk            0-3  ZENIT Stalino 
 STAKHANOVETS Artyomovsk       3-2  Avangard Druzhkovka 
 STAKHANOVETS Lisichansk       3-0  Avangard Gorlovka 
 Stakhanovets Sergo            w/o  BUREVESTNIK Krasny Luch 
 STAL Makeyevka                1-0  Stal Stalino 
 Stal Voroshilovsk             2-3  STAKHANOVETS Orjonikidze 
 ZIO Kramatorsk                4-2  Stakhanovets Krasnoarmeisk

Quarterfinals
 [May 11] 
 BUREVESTNIK Stalino           3-1  ZiL Krasnogorovka 
 [May 12] 
 SHAKHTA-30 Rutchenkovo        1-0  Stal Makeyevka   
 Stakhanovets Orjonikidze      0-1  STAKHANOVETS Lisichansk 
 ZENIT Stalino                12-0  Burevestnik Krasny Luch 
 ZIS Kramatorsk                3-1  Stakhanovets Krasny Luch 
 [May 18] 
 STAL Konstantinovka           8-0  Stakhanovets Artyomovsk  
 Bye: ZiO Kramatorsk

Semifinals
 [May 21] 
 Burevestnik Stalino           0-7  STAL Konstantinovka   
 ZENIT Stalino                 4-0  Stakhanovets Lisichansk 
 ZIS Kramatorsk                3-1  Shakhta-30 Rutchenkovo 
 Bye: ZiO Kramatorsk

Finals
 [May 24] 
 Stal Konstantinovka           0-0  Zenit Stalino 
 ZIS Kramatorsk                3-2  ZiO Kramatorsk

Final replays
 [May 25] 
 STAL Konstantinovka           w/o  Zenit Stalino

Group 19 (Simferopol)

Quarterfinals
 [Jul 6] 
 Pishchevik Simferopol         0-1  SPARTAK Simferopol

Semifinals
 [Jul 12] 
 Pishchevik Kerch              1-3  SPARTAK Simferopol   
 SUDOSTROITEL Sevastopol       3-2  Stal Kerch

Final
 [Jul 18] 
 SPARTAK Simferopol            2-1  Sudostroitel Sevastopol

Final stage

First round
 [Jul 21] 
 Zavod Elektrik Leningrad      0-6  SELMASH Kharkov 
 [Jul 29] 
 Sherstyanik Moskva            1-4  PISHCHEVIK Odessa 
 [Jul 30] 
 Dinamo Sverdlovsk             1-3  DINAMO Kazan 
   [Moshchanov 25 – Ivan Pashalyan 40, Lev Bessarab 55, ? 78] 
 Krasnoye Znamya Noginsk       1-1  Stalinets Leningrad 
   [Kolomkin 25 – Alexei Larionov 68] 
 [Aug 1] 
 AVANGARD Kramatorsk           w/o  Lokomotiv Zaporozhye 
 DINAMO Batumi                 2-0  Energiya Novocherkassk 
 DINAMO Kiev                   2-0  Lokomotiv Moskva 
   [Konstantin Shchegodskiy 7, Viktor Shilovskiy 61] 
 Dinamo-2 Kiev                 0-1  STAL Konstantinovka 
   [I.Gorobets 30] 
 SPARTAK Minsk                 w/o  Lokomotiv Kharkov 
 SPARTAK Moskva                5-2  ZiK Leningrad 
   [Viktor Semyonov-2, Alexei Sokolov, Vladimir Stepanov, Georgiy Glazkov pen - ?] 
 STALINETS-2 Moskva            3-2  Zdorovye Kharkov 
   [? 11, Sukhanov 62, Glebov 65 – Fursov 10, 48] 
 ZENIT Leningrad               5-4  Zenit Podlipki 
 [Aug 2] 
 DINAMO Nikolayev              3-0  Kirovskiy Zavod Leningrad 
   [Ivan Kolbanov 3, Vladimir Ishchenko 42, Grigoriy Kushnyrenko 89] 
 Fabrika Pravda Likino-Dulyovo 0-5  ELEKTRIK Leningrad 
 Lokomotiv-2 Kiev              1-7  METALLURG Moskva   
 [Aug 3] 
 Lokomotiv Saratov             2-2  Dinamo Stalingrad 
   [Shapovalov 52, Afinogenov 88 – Balyasov 48, Tokarev 72] 
 Lokomotiv-2 Moskva            1-1  Dinamo Bolshevo 
 Spartak Simferopol            1-2  LOKOMOTIV Kiev 
   [Zyukin 67 pen – Iosif Kachkin 12, Alexandr Galkin 18 pen] 
 STAKHANOVETS Stalino          5-0  Lokomotiv Yaroslavl 
   [Grigoriy Nesmekha 10, ?, Vasiliy Sidorov, Mikhail Vasin, Nikolai Kononenko, ??] 
 TORPEDO Gorkiy                7-0  Stroitel Sverdlovsk 
   [Viktor Drozdov-3, Leonid Yefimov-2, Nikolai Dunayev, Alexei Salakov] 
 [Aug 5] 
 CDKA Moskva                   0-1  SPARTAK Leningrad 
   [Ilya Bizyukov 40] 
 DINAMO Odessa                 2-1  Spartak-2 Moskva 
   [Leonid Orekhov, Mikhail Heison - ?] 
 Dinamo Voronezh               0-4  STALINETS Moskva 
 TORPEDO Moskva                3-1  Dinamo Moskva 
   [Alexandr Sinyakov 25, Konstantin Ryazantsev 65, Ramiz Karichev 88 – Konstantin Ratnikov 45] 
 [Aug 6] 
 DINAMO Alma-Ata               2-1  Zenit Taganrog                  [aet] 
   [Chernyshov 68, G.Bedritskiy 112 – Tishchenko 25] 
 DINAMO Tbilisi                4-1  Lokomotiv Tbilisi 
   [Viktor Berezhnoi 22, 68, Mikhail Berdzenishvili 55 pen, Luasarb Loladze 85 – Ivan Cherednichenko 12] 
 TEMP Baku                     w/o  Traktor Stalingrad 
 [Aug 7] 
 DINAMO Leningrad              2-1  Krylya Sovetov Moskva 
   [Sergei Yegorov 74, Arkadiy Alov 76 – Matvei Yenushkov 77] 
 Spartak Dnepropetrovsk        0-1  PISHCHEVIK Moskva 
   [P.Nikiforov 80] 
 [Aug 8] 
 Lokomotiv Baku                3-5  DINAMO Rostov-na-Donu 
   [Sergei Gudkov 30, 40, Konstantin Kitayev 55 – Valeriy Bekhtenev 22, 67, 82, Sergei Dombazov 55, ?] 
 SPARTAK Kharkov               3-0  Burevestnik Moskva 
   [Alexei Serov 1, Boris Gurkin 11, ?] 
 [Aug 10] 
 Stroitel Novosibirsk          0-0  Dinamo Irkutsk

First round replays
 [Jul 31] 
 Krasnoye Znamya Noginsk       3-4  STALINETS Leningrad 
   [Trofimov 1, Kolomkin 85, Korshakov 87 – Georgiy Lasin 25, 64, Valentin Shelagin 55, Alexei Larionov 82] 
 [Aug 4] 
 Lokomotiv Saratov             2-3  DINAMO Stalingrad 
   [Afinogenov 15, Tarasov 75 – Balyasov 10, 38, 43] 
 Lokomotiv-2 Moskva            2-3  DINAMO Bolshevo 
   [Dogadov 39, Ogurtsov 47 - ?] 
 [Aug 11] 
 Stroitel Novosibirsk          0-4  DINAMO Irkutsk

Second round
 [Aug 6] 
 Dinamo Kiev                   0-1  STALINETS Leningrad 
   [Georgiy Lasin 3] 
 Pishchevik Odessa             1-5  ELEKTRIK Leningrad 
   [? pen – Pavel Artemyev-2, Vasiliy Lotkov, Alexandr A.Fyodorov, Pyotr Karas] 
 Stal Konstantinovka           1-4  SPARTAK Moskva 
   [Anton Yakovlev 56 – Vladimir Stepanov 6, 60, Viktor Semyonov 25, Georgiy Glazkov 78] 
 [Aug 8] 
 Dinamo Nikolayev              0-2  LOKOMOTIV Kiev 
   [Alexandr Galkin 16, Konstantin Avramenko 69] 
 [Aug 9] 
 Avangard Kramatorsk           0-0  Metallurg Moskva    
 [Aug 11] 
 DINAMO Bolshevo               2-1  Spartak Kharkov 
   [Alexandr Shcherbakov 70, Viktor Osminkin 80 - ? 87] 
 DINAMO Tbilisi                4-2  Dinamo Rostov-na-Donu 
   [Boris Paichadze 2, 43, Georgiy Apridonidze 20, 44 – German Vodopyanov 49 pen, ? 86] 
 Stalinets Moskva              0-2  SELMASH Kharkov  
   [Fyodor Lukyanenko 55, Ivan Golubov 68]  
 [Aug 12] 
 Spartak Leningrad             1-5  STAKHANOVETS Stalino 
   [Sergei Strokov 12 – Mikhail Vasin 8, 38, Nikolai Kononenko 42, Nikolai Naumov 60, Grigoriy Nesmekha 80] 
 Torpedo Gorkiy                2-3  DINAMO Leningrad 
   [Viktor Drozdov 24, Mamulashvili 72 – Pyotr Bykov 43 pen, Arkadiy Alov 60, Nikolai Dementyev 72] 
 [Aug 13] 
 Dinamo Stalingrad             0-0  Temp Baku 
 Spartak Minsk                 1-3  ZENIT Leningrad 
   [Nikolai Zinovyev 63 – Nikolai Postavnin 22, Sergei Valker 40, Alexandr Fesenko 75] 
 [Aug 14] 
 Pishchevik Moskva             1-2  DINAMO Odessa 
   [? – Ivan Ishchenko 68, Ivan Borisevich 75] 
 TORPEDO Moskva                1-0  Stalinets-2 Moskva 
   [Ramiz Karichev 26] 
 [Aug 17] 
 DINAMO Kazan                 10-0  Dinamo Irkutsk 
 [Aug 21] 
 DINAMO Batumi                 3-2  Dinamo Alma-Ata                 [aet]

Second round replays
 [Aug 10] 
 Avangard Kramatorsk           1-6  METALLURG Moskva    
 [Aug 14] 
 Dinamo Stalingrad             0-1  TEMP Baku 
   [Makarov 80]

Third round
 [Aug 16] 
 ELEKTRIK Leningrad            1-0  Zenit Leningrad 
   [Pavel Artemyev 67] 
 Metallurg Moskva              1-3  STAKHANOVETS Stalino 
   [Sergei Kapelkin 52 – Nikolai Kononenko 23, Mikhail Vasin 68, Grigoriy Balaba 84] 
 [Aug 17] 
 Torpedo Moskva                0-3  DINAMO Bolshevo 
   [Vasiliy Trofimov 38, 67, Alexandr Shcherbakov 62] 
 [Aug 21] 
 Dinamo Odessa                 2-2  SelMash Kharkov 
   [Yuzef Sositskiy, Alexandr Bragin - ?] 
 DINAMO Tbilisi                4-2  Stalinets Leningrad           [in Moskva]   
   [Boris Paichadze 25, 52, Gayoz Jejelava 40, 53 – Georgiy Lasin 43, Alexei Larionov 78] 
 [Aug 26] 
 DINAMO Leningrad              2-1  Dinamo Kazan 
   [Alexei Baryshev 30, Konstantin Sazonov 79 – Lev Bessarab 18] 
 LOKOMOTIV Kiev                2-1  Dinamo Batumi 
   [Iosif Kachkin 10, Fyodor Kuzmenko 12 - Karp Karmatazyan 8]

Third round replays
 [Aug 22] 
 DINAMO Odessa                 4-1  SelMash Kharkov 
   [Alexandr Ilyashov 24, Ivan Borisevich 55, 57, Makar Gichkin 79 – Anatoliy Gorokhov 16] 
 [Aug 26] 
 SPARTAK Moskva                1-0  Temp Baku                       [aet]
   [Georgiy Glazkov 94]

Quarterfinals
 [Aug 22] 
 ELEKTRIK Leningrad            4-0  Dinamo Bolshevo 
   [Vladimir Lemeshev, ?..] 
 [Aug 31] 
 Stakhanovets Stalino          1-4  DINAMO Tbilisi          [in Kiev] 
   [Nikolai Kononenko 35 – Boris Paichadze 28, 60, 73, Tengiz Gavasheli 71] 
 [Sep 3] 
 Dinamo Odessa                 0-3  SPARTAK Moskva 
   [Georgiy Glazkov 24, Vladimir Stepanov 76, Alexei Sokolov 86] 
 [Sep 4] 
 DINAMO Leningrad              4-2  Lokomotiv Kiev 
   [Pyotr Bykov 47, 59, 64 pen, Nikolai Dementyev 62 – Alexandr Shatskiy 12, Konstantin Avramenko 49]

Semifinals
 [Sep 7] 
 ELEKTRIK Leningrad            2-1  Dinamo Tbilisi 
   [Vasiliy Lotkov 50, Nikolai Antsiferov 85 – Boris Paichadze 18]
 [Sep 10] 
 Dinamo Leningrad              0-1  SPARTAK Moskva 
   [Georgiy Glazkov 90 pen]

Final

External links
 Complete calendar. helmsoccer.narod.ru
 1938 Soviet Cup. Footballfacts.ru
 1938 Soviet football season. RSSSF

Soviet Cup seasons
Cup
Soviet Cup
Soviet Cup